Hollywood Hot Tubs is a 1984 comedy film starring Paul Gunning, Donna McDaniel, Michael Andrew and Jewel Shepard and directed by Chuck Vincent.

Plot
A teenager gets in trouble for vandalizing the Hollywood Sign and goes to work for his uncle's hot tub repair business rather than go to prison. The nephew falls in love with a secretary at his uncle's company, but risks losing her when caught in compromising situations while performing his duties as a hot tub repairman.

References

External links

1984 films
1980s sex comedy films
American sex comedy films
1980s English-language films
Films scored by Joel Goldsmith
Films set in Los Angeles
Teen sex comedy films
1984 comedy films
1980s American films